Dennis Bozic (born 2 August 1990 in Södertälje) is a Swedish ice hockey player of Croatian ancestry. He is currently playing with the KHL Medveščak in the Austrian Hockey League.

References

External links

1990 births
KHL Medveščak Zagreb players
Living people
Linköping HC players
Swedish ice hockey defencemen
Swedish people of Croatian descent
People from Södertälje
Sportspeople from Stockholm County